Martin Knight (born 17 October 1957) is a British rower. He competed in the men's coxless four event at the 1984 Summer Olympics.

References

External links
 

1957 births
Living people
British male rowers
Olympic rowers of Great Britain
Rowers at the 1984 Summer Olympics
Rowers from Greater London